Namik or Namık is a masculine given name. Notable people with the name include:

 Namig Abdullayev (born 1971), Azerbaijani wrestler
 Namik Dokle (born 1946), Albanian politician
 Namık Gedik (1911–1960), Turkish physician and politician 
 Namık İsmail (1890–1935l), Turkish painter
 Namık Kemal (1840–1888), Ottoman Turkish nationalist, poet, novelist, playwright, journalist, and social reformer
 Namik Paul (born 1987), Indian actor
 Namik Resuli (1908–1985), Albanian linguist and academic
 Namık Kemal Şentürk (1922–2020), Turkish politician
 Namık Tan (born 1956), Turkish diplomat
 Namık Uğurlu (1976–2015), better known as Ankaralı Namık, Turkish singer
 Namık Kemal Yolga (1914–2001), Turkish diplomat and statesman, known as the Turkish Schindler
 Namık Kemal Zeybek (born 1944), Turkish politician

Middle name 
 Mehmed Namık Pasha (1804–1892), Ottoman statesman

See also
 Namık (disambiguation)

Indian masculine given names
Turkish masculine given names
Albanian masculine given names